Plastiq Musiq is an independent record label which concentrates on melodic electronic music made primarily on analog synthesizers.

About 
Plastiq Musiq was created by Ronnie Martin of Joy Electric in 1997. It shared a partnership with Tooth and Nail Records from 1998 - 2001. The label was turned over to Mike Williams in 2005. In 2008, Mike Williams turned the label over to Andy Bird of Cut The Red Wire. As of 2013 the label is under the management of Jacob Graham and David Barnhart.

History

1997-2000

PM001 was a collection of songs called Electric Music Compilation 1, with exclusive tracks from Joy Electric, Starflyer 59, Pivot Clowj, and others, it sold out soon after its release. Next was a full length by ex-Mad at the World drummer Randy Rose as Mothership (Mothership had appeared on Electric Music Compilation 1 under the name 'Saturn Project'). It was a dark and brilliant album featuring lo-fi drum loops, beautiful melodies, and original radio broadcast samples from Orson Welles' The War of the Worlds.

In 1998 Plastiq Musiq became a subsidiary of Tooth & Nail records. The first release through this partnership was You Are Obsolete by House of Wires, which was a slightly more accessible incarnation of the Southern California, experimental band Pivot Clowj. There were three more proper releases through this partnership: Goodnight Star's self-titled album, Norway's The Essence of Norway, and House of Wires' second and final album Monogamy.

A fifth album was planned to be released with Tooth & Nail Records, Fine China's When the World Sings, but, due to low sales, the partnership dissolved before its release and Fine China was kept on Tooth & Nail's roster. During this period, Goodnight Star, Norway and Fine China's records were all produced by Ronnie Martin, further establishing the signature sound of the label.

2001-2010

After the split from Tooth & Nail, Plastiq continued to release records independently as it had before. From the glitchy abstract releases of The September Equation, to scoring a minor hit with We are Eyes, We are Builders by New York City band Soviet, who were swept up in the hysteria of an early 00' electroclash scene. It was also during this era that The September Equation's Nathan Schroeder contributed his efforts to solidify the enduring image of the label with his exceptional and minimal album cover designs.

By 2001 a modest scene was nearly taking shape around Plastiq Musiq artists. As most artists shared a common fan base but were scattered across the country, it was decided than an annual get-together was in order and thus The Autobahn Music Festival was born. Most of these daylong events took place in the spring in the small town of Wilmington Ohio. Occasionally a second installment would occur in the autumn. The festival ran consecutively for nearly a decade before it vanished.

In the years that followed, Plastiq Musiq had many releases, most notably from ex-House of Wires frontman Jon Sonnenberg as Travelogue, and a handful of EPs by label founder Ronnie Martin as Joy Electric, including the out-of-print Starcadia.

2005 saw the sale of Plastiq Musiq to Mike Williams who released Above and Underground by Anna Ranger and Be Still Oh Child Of Earth, All Heaven Is In Your Hands by Cut The Red Wire. In 2008 Williams moved to Scotland to continue his education and left Plastiq Musiq in the hands of Andy Bird. Several albums were released under Bird's command, including records by Flashlight Party, Jamie Long, and a collaboration between Jon Sonnenberg of Travelogue and Israel Slick of Red Orchestra called The Prometheus Project.

2013–Present

As of 2013 Plastiq Musiq changed management.

Artists

Discography
Most Plastiq Musiq releases are electronic pop or synth pop.

See also
 List of record labels

References

External links
 
 

American record labels
Record labels established in 1997
Electronic music record labels